Fetch by the Dodo is a pet insurance company, providing insurance for pet owners to cover veterinary bills in the United States and Canada.

History
Fetch was founded in September 2003 by husband and wife entrepreneurs Chris and Natasha Ashton after experiencing a high veterinary bill. In November 2003, Fetch Inc. was awarded the exclusive license for the Petplan brand in the United States. In July 2006, the company began selling its first policies, and started selling policies online later that year. The company formed partnerships with animal shelters, veterinarians, and health insurance providers to help sell 120,000 policies by 2014. In November 2008, the company launched fetch!, a glossy quarterly pet health magazine, in November 2008.

In 2019, Petplan hired Paul Guyardo as the new CEO. The same year it was acquired by private equity firm, Warburg Pincus. At the time, it had 200 employees and $130 million in annual sales. Since the acquisition, the company expanded into technology including a mobile app for communication and accessing insurance plans. 

In 2020, The Dodo took a minority stake in Petplan, with its name changing to Fetch by the Dodo.

Products
Petplan offers insurance for pets in the United States. It insures cats and dogs beginning at six weeks old with annual benefits ranging $2,500 to unlimited. Petplan extended its coverage during the COVID-19 pandemic. The new service covered treatment of a covid-infected pet, boarding of a pet if an owner was infected, adding a pet guardian to a plan, and all virtual vet visits.

References

External links
 Official site

Insurance companies of the United States
American companies established in 2003
Financial services companies established in 2003
Pet insurance
Financial services companies of the United States
Companies based in Philadelphia
2003 establishments in Pennsylvania